Sir Anthony Cope, 4th Baronet (16 November 1632 – 11 June 1675) was an English politician who sat in the House of Commons from 1660 to 1675.

Cope was the son of Sir John Cope, 3rd Baronet and his second wife Elizabeth Fane daughter of Francis Fane, 1st Earl of Westmorland. He succeeded to the baronetcy of Hanwell on the death of his father in 1638.

In 1660, Cope was elected Member of Parliament for Banbury in the Convention Parliament. In 1661 he was elected MP for Oxfordshire in the Cavalier Parliament and sat until his death in 1675. In the same year, he was commissioned a captain in Viscount Falkland's Regiment of Foot,  garrisoning Dunkirk. The city was sold and the regiment disbanded in 1662.
 
Cope died at the age of 42.

Cope married Mary Gerard, daughter of Dutton Gerard, 3rd Baron Gerard of Gerrard's Bromley. He had no children and the baronetcy passed to his brother John.

References

1632 births
1675 deaths
Baronets in the Baronetage of England
People from Oxfordshire (before 1974)
People from Banbury
English army officers
English MPs 1660
English MPs 1661–1679
17th-century English military personnel